Schefflera singalangensis is a species of flowering plant in the family Araliaceae. It is native to Malaysia and Indonesia.

References 

singalangensis
Flora of Malaya
Flora of Borneo
Flora of Sumatra